Helsinki Air Defence Regiment (Helsingin Ilmatorjuntarykmentti, HelItR) is a part of the Armoured Brigade in Parola. The regiment was previously an independent Finnish Army unit located in Hyrylä (in Tuusula municipality, some 30 km from Helsinki). The regiment trained 800 conscripts per year.

In 2005 the Minister of Defence Seppo Kääriäinen announced that the garrison in Hyrylä would be closed as part of a major structural change of the Finnish Defence Forces. This took place on January 1, 2007. The operations of the regiment moved to Armoured Brigade at Parola. Closing of the garrison will save the Defence Forces about 5 million euro per year.

Organisation
The last organization of the Regiment was
 Armoured Anti-Aircraft Battery (Panssari-ilmatorjuntapatteri)
 1st & 2nd Anti-Aircraft Missile Batteries (1. & 2. Ohjusilmatorjuntapatteri)
 Command Post Battery (Johtokeskuspatteri)
 NCO School (Aliupseerikoulu)

Equipment
 ItO 86 (M Igla)
 ItO 96 (Buk-M1)
 ItO 05 (ASRAD-R on Unimog 5000)
 ItO 90 M (CrotaleNG MOD on Sisu XA-181)
 ItO 12 (NASAMS II FIN, AIM-120 AMRAAM missiles)
 ItO 15 (FIM-92J Stinger RMP Block I)
 35 ItK 88 (35 mm Oerlikon gun) 
 23 Itk 61 (ZU-23-2)
 23 Itk 95 (modernised version of ZU-23-2)
 12.7 Itkk (NSV-12.7)

References

Artillery units and formations of Finland
Air defence units and formations
Regiments of Finland